Wahal is a small village in Navi Mumbai, Panvel taluka, in the Raigad district of Maharashtra, India.

Wahal is also a surname used by some North Indians belonging to the Kshatriya community. However, their genetic origin and migration history have not been sufficiently researched.

Villages in Raigad district